Von Luschan's chromatic scale (VLS) is a method of classifying skin color. It is also called the von Luschan scale or von Luschan's scale. It is named after its inventor, Felix von Luschan. The equipment consists of 36 opaque glass tiles which were compared to the subject's skin, ideally in a place which would not be exposed to the sun (such as under the arm). The  von Luschan scale was used to establish racial classifications of populations according to skin color; in this respect it is in contrast to the Fitzpatrick scale intended for the classification of the skin type of individuals introduced in 1975 by Harvard dermatologist Thomas B. Fitzpatrick to describe sun tanning behavior.

The von Luschan scale was used extensively throughout the first half of the 20th century in race studies and anthropometry. However, the results were inconsistent: in many instances, different investigators would give different readings of the same person. The von Luschan scale was largely abandoned by the early 1950s, replaced with methods utilizing reflectance spectrophotometry.

The following table shows the 36 categories of the von Luschan scale in relation to the six categories of the Fitzpatrick scale:

References

Further reading
 von Luschan F (1897). Beiträge zur Völkerkunde der Deutschen Schutzgebieten. Berlin: Deutsche Buchgemeinschaft.
 von Luschan F (1927). Völker, Rassen, Sprachen : Anthropologische Betrachtungen. Berlin: Deutsche Buchgemeinschaft.

External links

 Von Luschan's Chromatic Scale  (at bottom) and other anthropometric instruments at the Natural History Museum of Florence

Anthropometry
Skin pigmentation
Scientific racism
Color scales